Matt Rawle is a British actor. He was born in Birmingham on 10 March 1974. He has appeared in many high-profile theatre productions which include Martin Guerre, Evita and Zorro. His performances in the theatre have seen him nominated for numerous awards including WOS, Olivier awards and best haircut for an over 35.

Theatre Work

References

British male stage actors
People from Birmingham, West Midlands
1974 births
Living people